Myelobia lanceolatus is a moth in the family Crambidae. It is found in Colombia.

References

Chiloini